Sascha Pfeffer (born 19 October 1986) is a German professional footballer who plays as a midfielder for 1. FC Lokomotive Leipzig. He joined Dynamo Dresden from SC Borea Dresden in August 2007, and left for Chemnitzer FC five years later. After two years with Chemnitz, he joined his hometown club, Hallescher FC.

References

External links
 
 

1986 births
Living people
Sportspeople from Halle (Saale)
German footballers
Footballers from Saxony-Anhalt
Association football midfielders
2. Bundesliga players
3. Liga players
Regionalliga players
Dynamo Dresden players
Chemnitzer FC players
Hallescher FC players
1. FC Lokomotive Leipzig players